Sarah Dreher (born March 26, 1937, Hanover, Pennsylvania – died April 2, 2012, Amherst, Massachusetts) was an American lesbian novelist and playwright, and best known for her award-winning lesbian mystery series featuring amateur sleuth Stoner McTavish.

Her themes include "the anguish of lesbian relationships beginning, ending or mending. Dreher's lesbian protagonists are modern heroes searching for integrity and identity..." In the resolution of her mysteries, solutions other than resorting to traditional justice system intervention are part of the exploration of society outside the existing social paradigm.

Dreher has contributed essays and writings to a number of projects, including Off the Rag: Lesbians Writing about Menopause by Lee Lynch and  Akia Woods, "Waiting for Stonewall" in Sexual Practice/Textual Theory: Lesbian Cultural Criticism, and a contributed chapter to They Wrote the Book: Thirteen Women Mystery Writers Tell All.

In addition to writing, Dreher was a clinical psychologist in private practice, graduating first from Wellesley College, then gaining a Ph.D. in psychology from Purdue University.

Work 

Books:
 Solitaire and Brahms (1997) [novel]. (New Victoria)
 Stoner McTavish Series, (New Victoria)
 Stoner McTavish (1985)
 Something Shady (1986)
 Gray Magic (1987)
 A Captive in Time (1990)
 Otherworld (1993)
 Bad Company (1995)
 Shaman's Moon (1998)
 Love Murders (unpublished)
Lesbian Stages: Plays by Sarah Dreher. New Victoria. (1988),
Contains:
Alumnae News:  The Doris Day Years = winner of the 1st Jane Chambers National Playwriting Award 1987 for full length play
Base Camp
Backward, Turn Backward
This Brooding Sky
Hollandia ’45
PLACES PLEASE! The First Anthology of Lesbian Plays Aunt Lute publishing Company (1985) included:
8 x 10 Glossy by Sarah Dreher = Winner of the 1st Lesbian Playwrighting Contest, Theatre Rhinocros 1985 
Ruby Christmas by Sarah Dreher

Awards
 8 X 10 Glossy, 1985, 1st Lesbian Playwrighting Contest, Theatre Rhinoceros San Francisco CA winner
 Alumnae News: The Doris Day Years, 1987, 1st Jane Chambers National Playwrighting Award—full length play winner
 Shaman's Moon, 1998 Lambda Literary Award for Lesbian Mystery winner
 A Captive in Time, 1990 Lambda Literary Award for Lesbian Mystery finalist
 Medalist, 2005 The Alice B Readers Award

See also
 Markowitz, Judith A, foreword by Katherine V. Forrest. The Gay Detective Novel (MacFarland)
 Munt, Sally. Murder by the Book?: Feminism and the Crime Novel, 1990, (Routledge)
 Zimmerman, Bonnie. Safe Sea of Women: Lesbian Literature 1969-1989'', 1992 (Beacon)
 Lambda Literary Foundation
 Lesbian literature
 Lesbian Fiction

References

1937 births
2012 deaths
People from Hanover, Pennsylvania
People from Amherst, Massachusetts
Novelists from Pennsylvania
American lesbian writers
Lesbian dramatists and playwrights
Lesbian novelists
LGBT people from Pennsylvania
American women novelists
American women short story writers
20th-century American women writers
Lambda Literary Award winners
20th-century American novelists
American LGBT dramatists and playwrights
American LGBT novelists
20th-century American dramatists and playwrights
20th-century American short story writers
21st-century American women writers